ATCOM is a digital business agency based in Greece. The primary products of ATCOM are Netvolution, a web content management system and Tapvolution, a mobile content management system, both of which use the .Net Framework. ATCOM has its headquarters in Athens.

Capabilities

 Commerce
 Technology
 Business Transformation
 Usability & UX
 Visual Design
 Mobile
 Experiential/IoT
 Performance Marketing
 Enterprise Architecture
 Cloud Infrastructure

Education

Netvolution, ATCOM's content management system is being taught as a module at the Department of Informatics, of the University of Piraeus.

History 

 ATCOM becomes a Société Anonyme and a member of the Dionic Group of companies, listed in the Athens Stock Exchange, 2000.
 The first version of Netvolution is introduced, 2003. The second version follows on 2006
 ATCOM proceeded on the acquisition of Mindworks. Mindworks is a Digital Marketing Agency. The third version of Netvolution is introduced and ATCOM becomes a Gold Certified Partner of Microsoft.
 ATCOM acquired the Linkwise network. Linkwise is a Greek performance marketing and affiliate network, 2010
 ATCOM launch the first version of their mobile content management system, Tapvolution, 2010
 ATCOM wins the Business IT Award, for the specialization in Content Management Systems, 2012
 ATCOM wins two e-volution Awards, for best Ecommerce and M-Commerce platforms, 2012
 UXlab is introduced as a new business unit of ATCOM, focusing on Usabitily and User Experience services, 2012
 For the second time in a row, ATCOM wins a Business IT Award for the specialization in Content Management Systems, 2013
ATCOM is named 2015 Microsoft Country Partner of the Year (Greece) at the Microsoft Partner Awards 
ATCOM is named 2017 Microsoft Country Partner of the Year (Greece) at the Microsoft Partner Awards 
ATCOM acquires new Business Unit in partnership with Akamai, as an official Partner Reseller 
ATCOM is named e-Commerce agency of the Year, at the e-volution awards 2019
ATCOM is named e-Commerce agency of the Year, at the e-volution awards 2020, for the second consecutive year

See also 
 Content Management System
 List of content management systems

References

Technology companies of Greece
Greek companies established in 2000
Technology companies established in 2000
Companies based in Athens
Greek brands